Coorg was a constituency of the Lok Sabha (Lower House of the Parliament of India). It was used in the parliamentary election of 1951–1952. The constituency elected a single member of the Lok Sabha and was the sole Lok Sabha seat for the Coorg State. As of 1952, the constituency had 94,593 eligible voters.

1952 election
In the first elections after the independence of India, two candidates were in the fray in Coorg: N. Somana of the Indian National Congress and independent candidate K.T. Uthappa. K.T. Uthappa was a rich planter, former Assistant Commissioner of Coorg and candidate for the group that opposed the merger of Coorg into Mysore State.

63,813 voters participated in the election (67.46% of the eligible voters). N. Somana won the seat, obtaining 38,063 votes (59.65%).

Merger with Mysore State
In 1956 Coorg State merged into Mysore State. The former state was accorded two seats in the Mysore Legislative Assembly: Virajpet and Mercara. Both constituencies were included in the Mangalore Lok Sabha constituency, along with six other Assembly constituencies till delimitation of parliamentary constituencies in 2008. Now Coorg (Kodagu) area is a part of Mysore Lok Sabha constituency from 2009 Election, covering Virajpet and Madikeri Vidhan Sabha segments.

Assembly Constituencies
The following were the constituencies under Coorg Lok Sabha.

References

See also
 Kodagu district
 Mysore Lok Sabha constituency
 List of former constituencies of the Lok Sabha

Elections in Coorg State
Former constituencies of the Lok Sabha
1951 establishments in India
1957 disestablishments in India
Constituencies established in 1951
Constituencies disestablished in 1957
Former Lok Sabha constituencies of Karnataka